Hagan is a masculine given name which is borne by:

 Hagan Bayley (born 1951), British biochemist
 Hagan Beggs (1937–2016), Northern Irish-born Canadian actor
 Hagan Evans, Welsh former rugby union and rugby league footballer
 Hagan Landry (born 1994), American Paralympic athlete specializing in throwing events

See also
 Hagen (given name)

Masculine given names